B B Phuyal known as Bhanu Bhakta Phuyal (born 26 May 1986 at Morang district, Nepal) is a well-known film director in Nepal film industry for more than 12 years and chairman of Phuyal Shooting Studio Pvt. Ltd. He has started his career in this sector as an assistant director and actor. Later on, he paid attention to other dimensions of filmmaking such as production, cinematography, and direction besides acting. He has produced and directed several Nepali movies, documentaries and also music videos. His work as a director include the films The Last Kiss, Champion, and Love you Man. He has his own Shooting Studio name Phuyal Shooting Studio.

Early life
Phuyal was passionate about movies since his childhood. In 2005, he got an opportunity to work in Nepali Film as Assistant Director. In the same year, he directed and played in another Nepali teleserial Barbadai paryo. Since then, his professional career takes up.  Mr. Phuyal loves being versatile in his profession. Though he had started his journey as actor-cum-director.

Filmography

Awards

References

Nepalese film directors
1986 births
Living people
People from Morang District
21st-century Nepalese film directors